Samantha Fox is a New Hampshire politician.

Career
On November 6, 2018, Fox was elected to the New Hampshire House of Representatives where she represents the Merrimack 23 district. She assumed office on December 5, 2018. She is a Democrat. Fox resigned on January 12, 2021 as she was moving out of her district.

Personal life
Fox resides in Bow, New Hampshire. Fox is married and has one child.

References

Living people
People from Bow, New Hampshire
Women state legislators in New Hampshire
Democratic Party members of the New Hampshire House of Representatives
21st-century American politicians
21st-century American women politicians
Year of birth missing (living people)